Vanity Fair may refer to:

Arts, entertainment and media

Literature
 Vanity Fair, a location in The Pilgrim's Progress (1678), by John Bunyan
 Vanity Fair (novel), 1848, by William Makepeace Thackeray
 Vanity Fair (magazines), the title of several magazines including:
 Vanity Fair (British magazine), 1868–1914
 Vanity Fair (American magazine 1913–1936)
 Vanity Fair (magazine), 1983–present

Film
Vanity Fair (1911 film), directed by Charles Kent
 Vanity Fair (1915 film), a silent film directed by Charles Brabin and made by the Edison Company 
 Vanity Fair (1922 film), a silent British film directed by Walter Courtney Rowden
Vanity Fair (1923 film), a lost silent feature film directed by Hugo Ballin and produced by Samuel Goldwyn, with Prizmacolor sequence
 Vanity Fair (1932 film), directed by Chester M. Franklin and starring Myrna Loy, with the story updated to make Becky Sharp a social-climbing governess
 Vanity Fair (2004 film), directed by Mira Nair and starring Reese Witherspoon

Music
 Vanity Fair, a 1996 album by Seiko Matsuda
 "Vanity Fair", a song by Mr. Bungle from the 1999 album California
 "Vanity Fair", a 1952 orchestral music composition by Anthony Collins
 "Vanity Fair", a song by Squeeze from the 1981 album East Side Story
 "Vanity Fair", a 1990 song by The Ocean Blue
 "Vanity Fair", a song by World Party from the 1997 album Egyptology
 "Riding to Vanity Fair", a song by Paul McCartney from the 2005 album Chaos and Creation in the Backyard
 "Vanity Fair", an overture by Percy Fletcher (1879–1932)

Radio
Vanity Fair, a one-hour adaptation featuring Helen Hayes and Agnes Moorehead first broadcast on 7 January 1940 on Campbell Playhouse
Vanity Fair, a half-hour adaptation with Joan Lorring as Becky Sharp first broadcast 6 December 1947 on Favorite Story
Vanity Fair, a 1978 BBC Radio 4 ten-part serial with Sarah Badel as Becky, Timothy West as Joseph Sedley and Alec McCowen as William Thackeray
Vanity Fair, a 2004 BBC Radio broadcast adaptation by Stephen Wyatt, starring Emma Fielding as Becky
Vanity Fair, a 2019 BBC Radio 4 three-part adaptation by Jim Poyser with additional material by Al Murray

Television
 Vanity Fair (1939 TV series), a British television series about fashion
 Vanity Fair (1956 TV series), a British miniseries on BBC starring Joyce Redman
 Vanity Fair (1967 TV serial), a British miniseries on BBC starring Susan Hampshire
 Vanity Fair (1978 TV series), a Hong Kong television series
 Vanity Fair (1987 TV serial), a British miniseries on BBC featuring James Saxon
 Vanity Fair (1998 TV serial), a British miniseries on BBC starring Natasha Little
 Vanity Fair (2018 TV series), a British miniseries on ITV starring Olivia Cooke

Other uses in arts, entertainment and media
 Vanity Bonfire Fair, a fictional character from the 2005 novel Orphans of Chaos by John C. Wright

Brands and enterprises
 Vanity Fair (underwear), a brand of underwear owned by Fruit of the Loom
 Vanity Fair, a brand of napkin owned by Georgia-Pacific

See also
 Becky Sharp (film), a 1935 adaptation of Thackeray's novel starring Miriam Hopkins
 Vanity Fare, a 1960s UK pop/rock group